The Penedesenca is a Spanish breed of chicken originating in the autonomous community of Catalonia, in the area around Vilafranca del Penedès, the principal town of the historical Penedès region.

History

It is not known for how long country people in Catalonia have raised chickens that laid dark brown eggs. The first documentation of them is from 1928, when attempts were made to avert the extinction of the type. In 1932 selection of a black type was begun by a group of breeders in a town near Vilafranca del Penedès. A breed standard for this black Penedesenca was approved in 1946, with the name "Villafranquina Negra", or black Vilafranca chicken.

Uses 

It was developed in the first half of the twentieth century from native barnyard chickens, and today is noted for its dark brown eggs, said to be among the darkest of any breed of chicken.

References 

Chicken breeds
Chicken breeds originating in Spain